Saint Sacerdos of Saguntum (d. ca. 560 AD) is a Spanish saint.  He is venerated as a bishop of Saguntum (now Murviedro).  He is patron saint of this town.  He is said to have died of natural causes.

External links
Saints of May 5: Sacerdos of Saguntum

Medieval Spanish saints
6th-century bishops in the Visigothic Kingdom
560s deaths
6th-century Christian saints
Year of birth unknown